Kevin Whitaker (born April 28, 1957) is a United States career diplomat who is the former United States Ambassador to Colombia.  He was confirmed by the United States Senate on April 1, 2014, and sworn in on April 28, 2014.

Career 
Kevin Whitaker is a career member of the Senior Foreign Service of the United States.  Prior to his appointment as Ambassador to Colombia, he was Deputy Assistant Secretary of State for South America in the Bureau of Western Hemisphere Affairs.

Whitaker has served in the United Kingdom, Jamaica, Honduras, Nicaragua, and Venezuela, where he was Deputy Chief of Mission (2005–07).  In addition, he previously served in a number of positions at the Department of State, including as coordinator of the Office of Cuban Affairs (2002–05), Deputy Executive Secretary (2007–08), and director of the office of Andean affairs (2008–11).

During his Senate confirmation hearing for the post of ambassador to Colombia, Whitaker commented on the effects of the sack of Bogotá mayor Gustavo Petro on the peace process between the Colombian government and FARC. Colombian lawmakers criticized Whitaker's comments as an intervention in Colombian internal affairs. 

In May 2014 Venezuelan officials claimed that Whitaker was personally involved in a U.S. attempt to destabilize the leftist government of President Nicolás Maduro. The Venezuelan government, which blamed the U.S. for protests in Venezuela, cited supposed emails from opposition lawmaker María Corina Machado stating that Whitaker had offered his support to the opposition. Maduro's government gave no information on how it acquired apparently private emails, and offered no evidence to support the authenticity of the emails. In a statement, the State Department called the accusations "baseless and false" and said: "We've seen many times that the Venezuelan government tries to distract from its own actions by blaming the United States." An expert in cybersecurity forensics said the emails used by the Venezuelan government to accuse the opposition of a plot were fake.

Personal 
Whitaker was born in Ft. Campbell, Kentucky.  He is a graduate of Merritt Island High School, in Merritt Island, Florida.  He received his degree in history from the University of Virginia in 1979.

References

External links

1957 births
Living people
Ambassadors of the United States to Colombia
People from Christian County, Kentucky
Robinson Secondary School alumni
United States Foreign Service personnel
University of Virginia alumni